Mautner is a German surname. Notable people with the surname include:

Amora Mautner (born 1975), International Emmy-nominated Brazilian television director and former actress
Friederich Ignaz Mautner (1921–2001) was an Austrian-American mathematician
Jorge Mautner (born 1941) Brazilian singer-songwriter, violinist, actor, screenwriter
Menachem Mautner, Professor of Comparative Civil Law and Jurisprudence at the Tel Aviv University
Michael N. Mautner (born 1942), researcher in physical chemistry, astrobiology and astroecology
Wilhelm Mautner (1889–1944), Austrian-German economist

See also 
Jorge Mautner - O Filho do Holocausto, Brazilian documentary film
Mautner's lemma, Unitary representation theory
Mautner Project, national organization in the United States dedicated to improving the health of lesbians and other women who partner with women (WPW)

References